Moses of London (died 1268), was a thirteenth-century English grammarian, halakhist and Jewish scholar in London. His Darkhe ha-Nikkud veha-Neginah is a treatise on Hebrew punctuation and accentuation.

He was a descendant of Moses of Bristol, himself a descendant of Rabbi Simeon the Great of Mainz. His sons were Eliyahu Menachem of London, who was also a physician, and Hagin ben Moses.

References

13th-century English rabbis
Rabbis from London
Medieval Hebraists
Grammarians of Hebrew
English Orthodox Jews
1268 deaths